Coghlan Island is an island in the City and Borough of Juneau, Alaska, United States. It was named in 1885 by the U.S. Coast and Geodetic Survey for United States Navy officer Joseph Coghlan, who commanded the USS Adams during its survey of southeastern Alaska from 1883 to 1884.

History
Former Alaska state legislator Bruce Weyhrauch was stranded on Coghlan Island on April 22, 2007, after he fell out of his boat at about 6:00 PM that night; he was forced to swim to the island.  The United States Coast Guard District Seventeen, Sector Juneau, searched for Weyhrauch during the night.  A volunteer rescue team from the nonprofit organization SEADOGS located him at approximately 11:00 AM on April 23.

A Federal Aviation Administration non-directional radio beacon is located on the island.  It transmits the Morse code callsign CGL on a frequency of 212 kHz.

Notable flora and fauna
Coghlan Island was noted as the northernmost location of specimens of Triopha catalinae, a type of sea slug.

References

Islands of the Alexander Archipelago
Islands of Juneau, Alaska
Islands of Alaska